Godin is a French surname. Notable people with the surname include:

 Carel Godin de Beaufort (1934–1964), Dutch racing driver
 Christophe Godin (born 1968), French musician
 Dave Godin (1936–2004), English fan of American soul music
 Diego Godín, Uruguayan football player
 Eddy Godin (born 1957), Canadian ice hockey forward
 Elodie Godin (born 1985), French Olympic basketball player
 François Benjamin Godin (1828–1888), Quebec politician 
 Gérald Godin (1938–1994), Quebec poet and politician
 Guillaume Pierre Godin (c. 1260–1336), French Dominican theologian and cardinal
 Henri Godin (1892–1980), Belgian Olympic runner
 Isabel Godin des Odonais (1728–1792), Ecuadorean woman
 Jason Godin (born 1993), Canadian politician
 Jean-Baptiste André Godin (1817–1888), French industrialist
 Joseph Godin dit Bellefontaine (1695–1763), French deputy and military commander
 Louis Godin (1704–1760), French astronomer
 Maurice Godin (born 1932), Canadian politician
 Nesse Godin (born 1928), Lithuanian Holocaust survivor
 Nicolas Godin (born 1969), French musician
 Noël Godin (born 1945), Belgian humorist
 Osias Godin (1911–1988), Canadian politician
 Godin de Sainte-Croix, French military officer 
 Seth Godin (born 1960), American author
 Yvon Godin (born 1955), Canadian politician

See also
Godina

French-language surnames